Trachyrhachys is a genus of band-winged grasshoppers in the family Acrididae. There are at least four described species in Trachyrhachys.

Species
These four species belong to the genus Trachyrhachys:
 Trachyrhachys aspera Scudder, 1876 (finned grasshopper)
 Trachyrhachys coronata Scudder, 1876 (crowned grasshopper)
 Trachyrhachys funeralis Strohecker, 1945
 Trachyrhachys kiowa (Thomas, 1872) (Kiowa grasshopper)

References

Further reading

External links

 

Oedipodinae
Articles created by Qbugbot